This is a list of career achievements by Marianne Vos, a Dutch professional racing cyclist for UCI Women's Continental Team . Vos has competed on the track, on the road, in cyclo-cross and in mountain bike events since 2001.

Due to the dominant nature of her performances, Vos has drawn comparison to Eddy Merckx as being "the finest cyclist of [her] generation". After winning a junior European and World Championship in road racing, she continued her success in senior cycling by becoming World Champion in cyclo-cross and road racing at the age of 19. Vos added track racing World Championships when she won the points race in 2008 and the scratch race in 2011. At the 2008 Summer Olympics, she won the gold medal in the points race; at the 2012 Summer Olympics, gold in the women's road race. She is a 3 times World Road Race Champion – in 2006, 2012 and 2013 – and 8 times World Cyclo-cross Champion – in 2006, 2009, 2010, 2011, 2012, 2013, 2014 and 2022.

Overview 

* Current on 26 November 2022

Road

2002
 1st  Road race, National Cadet Road Championships
2004
 UCI Junior Road World Championships
1st  Road race
5th Time trial
 3rd Time trial, National Junior Road Championships
2005
 1st  Road race, National Junior Road Championships
 1st Omloop van Borsele
 2nd  Road race, UCI Juniors World Championships
 5th Ronde van Gelderland
2006
 1st  Road race, UCI Road World Championships
 1st  Road race, UEC European Under-23 Road Championships
 1st  Road race, National Road Championships
 1st  Overall Tour Féminin en Limousin
1st  Points classification
1st Young rider classification
1st Stages 1 (ITT) & 3
 1st Omloop van Borsele
 1st Omloop van Valkenburg
 1st Criterium Steenwijk
 1st Draai van de Kaai
 1st Criterium Oostvoorne
 1st Criterium Pijnacker
 2nd Overall Giro della Toscana
1st Points classification
1st Young rider classification
1st Stage 1 (TTT)
 2nd Holland Hills Classic
 4th Overall Ster Zeeuwsche Eilanden
 4th Overall Trophée d'Or Féminin
1st Stage 4
 5th Overall Emakumeen Bira
1st Points classification
1st Young rider classification
1st Stage 1
 6th Overall Gracia–Orlová
1st Stage 5
 6th Ronde van Gelderland
 7th Tour de Berne
2007
 1st  Overall UCI Road World Cup
 1st  Road race, UEC European Under-23 Road Championships
 1st  Overall Giro di San Marino
1st Stages 1 (ITT), 2, 3 & 4
 1st  Overall Ster Zeeuwsche Eilanden
1st Stages 1 (ITT) & 2
 1st La Flèche Wallonne
 1st Rund um die Nürnberger Altstadt
 1st Ronde van Gelderland
 1st Omloop van Borsele
 1st Holland Hills Classic
 1st Stage 2 Giro Rosa
 2nd  Road race, UCI Road World Championships
 2nd Road race, National Road Championships
 2nd Overall Emakumeen Bira
1st Points classification
1st Stages 2 & 3
 2nd Novilon Internationale Damesronde van Drenthe
 2nd Tour de Berne
 3rd Tour of Flanders
 3rd Ronde van Drenthe
 4th Coupe du Monde Cycliste Féminine de Montréal
 6th Overall Tour de l'Aude
1st Stages 1, 3, 4 & 7
 7th Overall Holland Ladies Tour
1st  Points classification
1st  Young rider classification
1st Stages 1 & 4
 7th GP de Plouay
 10th Open de Suède Vårgårda
2008
 1st  Road race, National Road Championships
 1st  Overall Gracia–Orlová
1st Points classification
1st Mountains classification
1st Stages 1, 2 & 3 (ITT)
 1st  Overall Vuelta a Occidente
1st Points classification
1st Young rider classification
1st Prologue, Stages 1 & 2 (ITT)
 1st  Overall Emakumeen Bira
1st Points classification
1st Stages 1, 2, 3 (ITT) & 4
 1st Grand Prix de Dottignies
 1st La Flèche Wallonne
 1st GP de Santa Ana
 2nd  Road race, UCI Road World Championships
 2nd Overall Vuelta a El Salvador
1st Young rider classification
1st Stages 1, 2 & 3 (ITT)
 2nd Ronde van Drenthe
 3rd Overall Giro della Toscana
1st Stage 2
 3rd Omloop van Borsele
 4th Overall Krasna Lipa Tour
1st Stages 2 & 3 (ITT)
 4th Overall Holland Ladies Tour
1st  Young rider classification
 4th Rund um die Nürnberger Altstadt
 5th Tour of Flanders
 6th Road race, Summer Olympics
 9th Overall Giro del Trentino Alto Adige-Südtirol
2009
 1st  Overall UCI Road World Cup
 1st  Road race, National Road Championships
 1st  Overall Holland Ladies Tour
1st Young rider classification
 1st Trofeo Alfredo Binda
 1st Novilon Eurocup Ronde van Drenthe
 1st La Flèche Wallonne
 1st 7-Dorpenomloop Aalburg
 1st Holland Hills Classic
 1st Open de Suède Vårgårda
 2nd  Road race, UCI Road World Championships
 2nd Overall Tour de Bretagne
1st Stages 3, 4 (ITT) & 5
 2nd Overall Thüringen Rundfahrt
1st  Points classification
1st  Young rider classification
1st Stage 1
 2nd Omloop van Borsele
 2nd Tour de Berne
 2nd GP de Plouay
 UEC European Under-23 Road Championships
3rd  Road race
3rd  Time trial
 3rd Overall Grande Boucle
1st Stage 4
 3rd Overall Tour de l'Aude
1st Stages 4, 7 & 8
 3rd Overall Gracia–Orlová
1st Stage 1
 4th Overall Giro della Toscana
1st Stages 4 (ITT) & 6
 4th Ronde van Gelderland
 6th Tour of Flanders
 6th Rund um die Nürnberger Altstadt
 8th Ronde van Drenthe
2010
 1st  Overall UCI Road World Cup
 National Road Championships
1st  Time trial
2nd Road race
 1st  Overall Gracia–Orlová
1st Stages 1, 4 & 5
 1st  Overall Holland Ladies Tour
1st  Points classification
1st Stages 3 & 7
 1st Trofeo Alfredo Binda
 1st 7-Dorpenomloop Aalburg
 1st Emakumeen Saria
 2nd  Road race, UCI Road World Championships
 2nd Tour of Flanders
 2nd GP de Plouay
 3rd Open de Suède Vårgårda TTT
 4th Overall Emakumeen Bira
1st Points classification
1st Stages 1 & 3b
 4th Novilon Eurocup Ronde van Drenthe
 4th Omloop van Borsele
 4th GP Ciudad de Valladolid
 6th Overall Ster Zeeuwsche Eilanden
 6th Overall Giro della Toscana
1st Stage 5
 6th La Flèche Wallonne
 7th Overall Giro d'Italia Femminile
1st  Points classification
1st  Young rider classification
1st Stages 5 & 6
 7th Overall La Route de France
1st Stages 2 & 5
 8th Overall Tour de l'Aude
1st  Points classification
1st  Young rider classification
1st Stage 8
2011
 National Road Championships
1st  Road race
1st  Time trial
 1st  Overall Giro d'Italia Femminile
1st  Points classification
1st  Mountains classification
1st Stages 1, 3, 6, 7 & 9
 1st  Overall Emakumeen Bira
1st Points classification
1st Stages 1, 2 & 4
 1st  Overall Ster Zeeuwsche Eilanden
1st Stages 1 (ITT) & 3
 1st  Overall Holland Ladies Tour
1st Points classification
1st Stages 1, 5, & 6
 1st Ronde van Drenthe
 1st Drentse 8
 1st 7-Dorpenomloop Aalburg
 1st Gooik–Geraardsbergen–Gooik
 1st La Flèche Wallonne
 1st Grand Prix Elsy Jacobs
 1st GP Ciudad de Valladolid
 1st Durango-Durango Emakumeen Saria
 UCI Road World Championships
2nd  Road race
10th Time trial
 3rd Overall Energiewacht Tour
1st Stages 1 & 4
 3rd Tour of Flanders
 3rd Omloop van Borsele
 3rd GP de Plouay
 8th Overall Trophée d'Or Féminin
1st Stage 4
2012
 1st  Road race, Summer Olympics
 1st  Road race, UCI Road World Championships
 1st  Overall UCI Road World Cup
 1st  Overall Giro Rosa
1st  Points classification
1st Stages 1, 2 (ITT), 4, 7 & 8
 1st  Overall Tour Féminin en Limousin
1st Points classification
1st Stages 1 & 4
 1st  Overall Grand Prix Elsy Jacobs
1st Points classification
1st Stage 1
 1st  Overall Holland Ladies Tour
1st  Sprints classification
1st Stages 4 & 6
 1st Ronde van Drenthe
 1st Novilon Euregio Cup
 1st Trofeo Alfredo Binda
 1st GP de Plouay
 1st Amstel Curaçao Race
 2nd Road race, National Road Championships
 2nd La Flèche Wallonne
 2nd GP Comune di Cornaredo
 2nd Holland Hills Classic
 3rd Overall Energiewacht Tour
 Open de Suède Vårgårda
3rd Team time trial
3rd Road race
 5th GP Stad Roeselare
2013
 UCI Road World Championships
1st  Road race
2nd  Team time trial
 1st  Overall UCI Road World Cup
 1st  Overall Grand Prix Elsy Jacobs
1st Points classification
1st Stage 2
 1st  Overall Trophée d'Or Féminin
1st Stages 1, 2 & 4
 1st Tour of Flanders
 1st La Flèche Wallonne
 1st Drentse 8 van Dwingeloo
 1st Ronde van Drenthe
 1st Durango-Durango Emakumeen Saria
 1st Open de Suède Vårgårda
1st Road race
2nd Team time trial
 1st GP de Plouay
 1st Profronde van Tiel
 1st Ridderronde Maastricht
 Giro della Toscana
1st Prologue, Stages 2 & 3
 2nd Road race, National Road Championships
 5th Overall Emakumeen Euskal Bira
1st  Points classification
1st Stage 1
 5th Gooik–Geraardsbergen–Gooik
 6th Overall Giro d'Italia Femminile
1st  Points classification
1st Stages 3, 4 & 7
 6th Trofeo Alfredo Binda
2014
 1st  Overall Giro d'Italia Femminile
1st  Points classification
1st Stages 1, 4, 5 & 7
 1st  Overall The Women's Tour
1st  Points classification
1st Stages 3, 4 & 5
 1st La Course by Le Tour de France
 1st 7-Dorpenomloop Aalburg
 1st Gooik–Geraardsbergen–Gooik
 1st Durango-Durango Emakumeen Saria
 1st Sparkassen Giro
 1st Stage 3 Holland Ladies Tour
 1st Stage 2 (TTT) Belgium Tour
 2nd Overall Festival Luxembourgeois du Elsy Jacobs
1st  Points classification
1st Prologue & Stage 2
 2nd Overall Emakumeen Euskal Bira
1st  Points classification
1st Stages 2 & 4
 2nd Overall Tour of Norway
1st Prologue & Stage 2
 Open de Suède Vårgårda
2nd Team time trial
4th Road race
 2nd GP de Plouay
 National Road Championships
3rd Road race
3rd Time trial
 6th La Flèche Wallonne
 10th Road race, UCI Road World Championships
2015
 2nd Marianne Vos Classic
 6th Ronde van Gelderland
2016
 1st Pajot Hills Classic
 1st 7-Dorpenomloop Aalburg
 1st Keukens Van Lommel Classic
 2nd Overall Belgium Tour
1st  Points classification
1st  Sprints classification
1st Stage 2
 2nd Gran Premio Bruno Beghelli
 3rd Road race, National Road Championships
 3rd La Course by Le Tour de France
 3rd Crescent Vårgårda TTT
 4th Overall Tour of California
1st Stage 3
 4th Overall The Women's Tour
1st  Points classification
1st Stage 4
 4th Ronde van Gelderland
 4th Holland Hills Classic
 5th Overall Thüringen Rundfahrt
1st Stages 1, 3 & 5
 7th Road race, UEC European Road Championships
 9th Road race, Summer Olympics
 9th La Flèche Wallonne
 10th Overall Festival Luxembourgeois du Elsy Jacobs
 10th Acht van Westerveld
2017
 1st  Road race, UEC European Road Championships
 1st  Overall BeNe Ladies Tour
1st  Points classification
1st  Sprints classification
1st Stages 2b (ITT) & 3
 1st  Overall Tour of Norway
1st  Points classification
 1st Trofee Maarten Wynants
 1st Gooik–Geraardsbergen–Gooik
 1st 7-Dorpenomloop Aalburg
 2nd Crescent Vårgårda
 3rd Overall Belgium Tour
1st  Points classification
1st Stage 1
 3rd Omloop van Borsele
 4th RideLondon Classique
 7th Ronde van Drenthe
2018
 1st  Overall Tour of Norway
1st  Points classification
1st Stages 1, 2 & 3
 1st  Overall BeNe Ladies Tour
1st  Sprints classification
1st  Points classification
1st Stage 1
 1st Postnord Vårgårda  Road race
 1st Stage 8 Giro Rosa
 2nd  Road race, UEC European Road Championships
 2nd Overall The Women's Tour
1st  Points classification
 2nd RideLondon Classique
 2nd GP de Plouay
 3rd Road race, National Road Championships
 3rd Trofeo Alfredo Binda
 3rd Brabantse Pijl
 5th Ronde van Drenthe
 10th Amstel Gold Race
2019
 1st  Overall Tour de Yorkshire
1st Stage 2
 1st  Overall Tour of Norway
1st Stages 2, 3 & 4
 1st  Overall Tour Cycliste Féminin International de l'Ardèche
1st  Points classification
1st Stages 1, 2, 3, 6 & 7
 1st Trofeo Alfredo Binda
 1st La Course by Le Tour de France
 Giro Rosa
1st Stages 2, 3, 7 & 10
 1st Stage 2 The Women's Tour
 2nd  Road race, European Games
 2nd Road race, National Road Championships
 2nd Postnord Vårgårda West Sweden
 3rd Amstel Gold Race
 3rd Tour of Guangxi
 4th La Flèche Wallonne
 6th Road race, UCI Road World Championships
 6th RideLondon Classique
 7th Strade Bianche
 10th Three Days of Bruges–De Panne
2020
 Giro Rosa
1st  Points classification
1st Stages 3, 5 & 6
 2nd La Course by Le Tour de France
 4th Road race, UCI Road World Championships
 4th Road race, National Road Championships
 4th Liège–Bastogne–Liège
 6th Strade Bianche
 8th Road race, UEC European Road Championships
 9th La Flèche Wallonne
2021
 1st Gent–Wevelgem
 1st Amstel Gold Race
 Giro Rosa
1st Stages 3 & 7
 2nd  Road race, UCI Road World Championships
 2nd Paris–Roubaix
 2nd Trofeo Alfredo Binda
 3rd La Course by Le Tour de France
 4th Overall Holland Ladies Tour
1st  Points classification
1st Prologue, Stages 4 & 5 
 5th Road race, Summer Olympics
 6th Liège–Bastogne–Liège
 7th Strade Bianche
2022
 Tour de France
1st  Points classification
1st Stages 2 & 6
Held  after Stages 2–6
 Combativity award Overall
 Tour of Scandinavia
1st Stages 1, 2, 3 & 6
 Giro d'Italia
1st Stage 2 & 5
 2nd Gent–Wevelgem
 4th Road race, National Road Championships
 5th Veenendaal–Veenendaal Classic
 7th Strade Bianche

General classification results

Classics results timeline

Major championship results

Cyclo-cross

2002–2003
 3rd National Championships
2003–2004
 1st Pijnacker
 2nd  UEC European Championships
 3rd Koksijde
 3rd Torino
2004–2005
 2nd National Championships
 3rd Milan
2005–2006
 1st  UCI World Championships
 1st  UEC European Championships
 2nd Overall UCI World Cup
2nd Kalmthout
2nd Pijnacker
2nd Milan
2nd Liévin
 2nd National Championships
2006–2007
 2nd Overall UCI World Cup
1st Treviso
2nd Kalmthout
2nd Hoogerheide
 2nd National Championships
 3rd  UEC European Championships
2007–2008
 2nd  UCI World Championships
2008–2009
 1st  UCI World Championships
 UCI World Cup
1st Heusden-Zolder
 2nd Overall Gazet van Antwerpen
1st Sluitingsprijs
2nd Lille
3rd Loenhout
 2nd Frankfurt
 2nd Antwerpen
 2nd Pétange
2009–2010
 1st  UCI World Championships
 1st  UEC European Championships
 2nd Overall UCI World Cup
1st Koksijde
1st Heusden-Zolder
1st Hoogerheide
2nd Nommay
2nd Kalmthout
3rd Roubaix
 6th Overall Gazet van Antwerpen
1st Lille
1st Oostmalle
2nd Loenhout
 1st Frankfurt
 1st Pétange
 1st Sint-Michielsgestel
 1st Surhuisterveen
 2nd National Championships
 Superprestige
2nd Gavere
2010–2011
 1st  UCI World Championships
 1st  National Championships
 3rd Overall UCI World Cup
1st Pontchâteau
2nd Kalmthout
2nd Heusden-Zolder
3rd Hoogerheide
 Gazet van Antwerpen
1st Loenhout
 1st Pétange
 1st Cauberg
 2nd Antwerpen
 3rd Tervuren
2011–2012
 1st  UCI World Championships
 1st  National Championships
 2nd Overall UCI World Cup
1st Namur
1st Heusden-Zolder
1st Liévin
1st Hoogerheide
2nd Koksijde
 Superprestige
1st Gieten
1st Diegem
 Gazet van Antwerpen
1st Essen
1st Loenhout
1st Lille
2nd Oostmalle
2012–2013
 1st  UCI World Championships
 1st  National Championships
 UCI World Cup
1st Heusden-Zolder
1st Rome
1st Hoogerheide
3rd Namur
 BPost Bank Trophy
1st Lille
 1st Pétange
 1st Surhuisterveen
 1st Otegem
 1st Rucphen
 Superprestige
2nd Gieten
2013–2014
 1st  UCI World Championships
 1st  National Championships
 3rd Overall UCI World Cup
1st Cauberg
1st Nommay
2nd Namur
2nd Heusden-Zolder
2nd Rome
 BPost Bank Trophy
1st Loenhout
2nd Baal
 1st Brabant
 1st Woerden
 1st Surhuisterveen
 1st Rucphen
 1st Leuven
 2nd Lille
2014–2015
 1st  National Championships
 UCI World Cup
1st Heusden-Zolder
2nd Namur
 Superprestige
1st Diegem
 BPost Bank Trophy
2nd Loenhout
 1st Surhuisterveen
 3rd  UCI World Championships
2016–2017
 1st  National Championships
 UCI World Cup
1st Heusden-Zolder
1st Rome
1st Hoogerheide
 Superprestige
1st Diegem
 DVV Trophy
1st Baal
2nd Loenhout
 Brico Cross
1st Maldegem
 1st Surhuisterveen
 2nd  UCI World Championships
2017–2018
 Brico Cross
1st Maldegem
2018–2019
 1st  Overall UCI World Cup
1st Waterloo
1st Bern
1st Heusden-Zolder
1st Pontchâteau
2nd Namur
3rd Hoogerheide
 Superprestige
1st Ruddervoorde
2nd Gieten
 Brico Cross
1st Ronse
 1st Woerden
 2nd  UEC European Championships
 2nd National Championships
 3rd  UCI World Championships
2019–2020
 Ethias Cross
1st Essen
 1st Xativa
2020–2021
 Ethias Cross
1st Essen
 3rd Mol
2021–2022
 1st  UCI World Championships
 1st  National Championships
 UCI World Cup
1st Waterloo
1st Iowa City
1st Rucphen
1st Hoogerheide
2nd Val di Sole
2022–2023
 X²O Badkamers Trophy
1st Kortrijk
 2nd Woerden

Mountain bike

2002
 1st  Cross-country, National Junior Championships
2003
 1st  Cross-country, National Junior Championships
2004
 1st  Cross-country, National Junior Championships
2005
 1st  Cross-country, National Junior Championships
 UCI Junior World Cup
1st Houffalize
 1st MTB Cup Heeswijk
2013
 1st  Overall Afxentia Stage Race
1st Stages 2 & 3
 MTB Topcompetitie
1st Nieuwkuijk
1st Norg
1st Steenwijk
 1st Egmond-pier-Egmond
 1st Sea Otter Classic
 1st MTB Cup Heeswijk
2014
 1st Egmond-pier-Egmond
 1st Sea Otter Classic
2015
 MTB Topcompetitie
1st Nieuwkuijk

Track

2007
 National Championships
1st  Points
1st  Scratch
2nd Individual pursuit
 UCI World Cup Classics
1st Points, Beijing
1st Scratch, Beijing
2008
 1st  Points, Olympic Games
 1st  Points, UCI World Championships
 1st Scratch, UCI World Cup Classics, Copenhagen
 1st Four Days of Rotterdam (with Adrie Visser)
2010
 1st Elimination, UCI World Cup Classics, Melbourne
2011
 1st  Scratch, UCI World Championships
2012
 1st   Madison (with Roxane Knetemann), National Championships
 1st Elimination, Revolution Series Manchester

Gravel
2022
 1st  National Championships

References

Vos